D40 is a state road connecting A7 motorway at Sveti Kuzam interchange, to  D8 state road and to Port of Bakar.

The road, as well as all other state roads in Croatia, is managed and maintained by Hrvatske ceste, a state owned company.

Road junctions and populated areas

Maps

Sources

D040
D040